Qasr-e Qomsheh (also Romanized as Qaşr-e Qomsheh; also known as Kasr-e Gūmīsheh and Qasr-i-Qumisheh) is a town in Derak District, in the Central District of Shiraz County, Fars Province, Iran. At the 2006 census, its population was 10,890, in 2,594 families.

References 

Populated places in Shiraz County